Tau Malachi (full name: Tau Malachi eben Ha-Elijah; born Brett Cagle in 1962) is an American neo-Gnostic religious leader and writer. He is currently the bishop of Ecclesia Pistis Sophia, also known as the Sophia Fellowship.

Tau Malachi is the current spiritual leader of the Sophian Gnostic tradition, a neo-Gnostic group. Although members claim that the lineage dates back to the 1700s, the current tone of Ecclesia Pistis Sophia was innovated in the 1880s by Tau Miriam, an Englishwoman. She initiated her protégé Tau Elijah, who left England in the early twentieth century to establish the lineage in the Bay Area of Northern California. In the 1950s, Tau Elijah retired from public teaching and initiating to live in the Lake Tahoe basin, where he died in the 1970s.

Biography
Tau Malachi was born Brett Cagle in 1962 in the United States, and was 8 years old when he met his spiritual leader Tau Elijah. As a disciple of Tau Elijah during the 1970s, he received the spiritual name Tau Malachi eben Ha-Elijah.

In 1983, Tau Malachi founded the Sophia Fellowship.

Tau Malachi is also a Martinist. Other than Christianity and Gnosticism, he has also studied and participated in Vajrayana Buddhism, Vedanta, Sufism, and Native American shamanism.

Tau Malachi currently resides in Grass Valley, California.

Books
Books by Tau Malachi:

See also
Stephan A. Hoeller

References

External links

Ecclesia Pistis Sophia
YouTube channel of the Ecclesia Pistis Sophia
Facebook page of the Ecclesia Pistis Sophia

Living people
1962 births
Gnostics
American spiritual teachers
American Christian mystics
People from Grass Valley, California